The supreme bishop, abbreviated O.M., is the leader or primate of the autocephalous Independent Catholic denomination Iglesia Filipina Independiente (Philippine Independent Church) or IFI, known informally as the "Aglipayan Church". 

The supreme bishop is elected by the General Assembly of the Church and heads the Executive Commission, which is the highest policy-making body in the absence of the General Assembly. 

Rhee Timbang was elected Obispo Máximo on May 9, 2017 by unanimous vote of delegates during their 13th Triennial General Assembly and officially proclaimed the next day, after serving as the Bishop of Surigao. He is the thirteenth in a line of succession from Gregorio Aglipay, the first Obispo Máximo.

The supreme bishop's office is at the Obispado Máximo, National Cathedral of the Holy Child, located in Taft Avenue, Manila.

List of supreme bishops

Election and term of office
The supreme bishop is the primate, spiritual head, and chief executive of the Philippine Independent Church. A supreme bishop is elected from the bishops of the Church every six years, and cannot be re-elected as per the Church's 1977 Constitution and Canons. He is responsible for the ecclesiastical government of the Church and is the spiritual head of almost 6 million Aglipayans throughout the Philippines and some dioceses in the United States and Canada.

See also

 Religion in the Philippines
 List of dioceses of the Philippine Independent Church

References

External links 
The Obispo Maximo – Official website of the Iglesia Filipina Independiente

Philippine Independent Church
Episcopacy
Ecclesiastical titles
Religious leadership roles